

The Lt. Frank J. Haggerty Award is given to the All-New York Metropolitan NCAA Division I men's college basketball player of the year, presented by the National Invitation Tournament (NIT) and the Met Basketball Writers Association (MBWA). First presented in 1936, it is arguably the oldest and most prestigious award given to a metropolitan area player. Two schools with previous winners are no longer classified as Division I – CCNY and NYU are now Division III and are therefore ineligible to have future winners.

The award has gone to players from 15 Division I schools. St. John's University in Jamaica, New York has the most at 27, roughly twice the 15 awards received by players from number two Seton Hall University.

Three players won the award three times: Jim McMillian from Columbia University (1968–1970), Chris Mullin of St. John's (1983–1985) and Charles Jenkins of Hofstra (2009–2011). McMillian would go on to win the 1972 NBA Championship with the Los Angeles Lakers; Mullin went on to win two Olympic gold medals (1984, 1992) with Team USA, was a five-time NBA All-Star and was elected to the Naismith Memorial Basketball Hall of Fame in 2011; and Jenkins has played in the NBA and Europe.

Key

Winners

Winners by school

References
General

Specific

Awards established in 1936
College basketball trophies and awards in the United States
Sports in the New York metropolitan area